The 1904 Cleveland Naps season was a season in American baseball. The team finished fourth in the American League with a record of 86–65, 7½ games behind the Boston Americans.

Regular season

Season standings

Record vs. opponents

Notable transactions 
 August 18, 1904: Nick Kahl was purchased by the Naps from the Colorado Springs Millionaires.

Roster

Player stats

Batting

Starters by position 
Note: Pos = Position; G = Games played; AB = At bats; H = Hits; Avg. = Batting average; HR = Home runs; RBI = Runs batted in

Other batters 
Note: G = Games played; AB = At bats; H = Hits; Avg. = Batting average; HR = Home runs; RBI = Runs batted in

Pitching

Starting pitchers 
Note: G = Games pitched; IP = Innings pitched; W = Wins; L = Losses; ERA = Earned run average; SO = Strikeouts

Notes

References 
1904 Cleveland Naps season at Baseball Reference

Cleveland Guardians seasons
Cleveland Naps season
1904 in sports in Ohio